Arthur Payne may refer to:

 Arthur Payne (speedway rider) (born 1923), international speedway rider
 Arthur Payne (cricketer) (1831–1910), English amateur cricketer
 Arthur Gay Payne (1840–1894), English sports editor and writer on cookery
 Arthur Payne (politician) (born 1946), American politician in the Alabama House of Representatives

See also
Arthur Pain (1841–1920), Anglican bishop